The Harrison Tweed Award was created in 1956 to recognize the extraordinary achievements of state and local bar associations that develop or significantly expand projects or programs to increase access to civil legal services for poor persons or criminal defense services for indigents. This award is given annually by the American Bar Association's (ABA) Standing Committee on Legal Aid and Indigent Defendants and the National Legal Aid & Defender Association, is presented during the ABA Annual Meeting at a joint luncheon of the National Conference of Bar Presidents, National Association of Bar Executives and National Conference of Bar Foundations. The award is named for Harrison Tweed, past president of Sarah Lawrence College.

1953 • New York State Governor Thomas E. Dewey, and the state legislature formed the temporary Tweed Commission (named after its chair, lawyer Harrison Tweed) to conduct public and private hearings regarding the post-World War II court situation; such as overall caseload volumes that had grown to the point where court delay was becoming a major problem and procedural reform was necessary.

1955 • The Legislature created the Judicial Conference to allow for periodic meetings of judges to discuss problems and established the Office of State Administrator; their functions were merely advisory but allowed the permanent examination of court operations.

1958 • The Tweed Commission Report proposed reform through centralization of court administration, simplification of court structure, and continued supervision of the courts by the Judicial Conference and the Appellate Division.

1962 • A new Judiciary Article for the State Constitution, implementing many of the Tweed Commission recommendations, was approved by the Legislature and the voters; this article created the "Unified Court System," established the various trial courts, established the Administrative Board of the Judicial Conference (the Chief Judge of the Court of the Appellate Division), and conferred on the Appellate Divisions various administrative powers.

NOTE: Tweed fellow family members included Simeon Eben Baldwin, Connecticut Governor and cofounder, American Bar Association; and Roger Nash Baldwin, cofounder and the first executive director, American Civil Liberties Union (ACLU).

External links
Virtual Wall of Justice
NLADA Sponsors
Harrison Tweed Papers

Awards established in 1956
Humanitarian and service awards
Legal awards
1956 establishments in the United States
American Bar Association